The 2015 Ningbo Challenger was a professional tennis tournament played on hard courts. It was the third edition of the tournament (for men) and part of the 2015 ATP Challenger Tour. It took place in Ningbo, China.

Singles  entrants

Seeds

Other entrants 
The following players received wildcards into the singles main draw:
  Qiu Zhuoyang
  He Yecong
  Sun Fajing
  Li Yuanfeng

The following players received entry into the singles main draw as a special exempt:
  Flavio Cipolla

The following players received entry from the qualifying draw:
  Zhang Zhizhen
  Takuto Niki
  Riccardo Ghedin
  Daniel Masur

The following player entered as a lucky loser:
  Florian Fallert

Champions

Singles 

  Lu Yen-hsun def.  Jürgen Zopp, 7–6(7–3), 6–1

Doubles 

  Dudi Sela /  Amir Weintraub def.  Nikola Mektić /  Franko Škugor, 6–3, 3–6, [10–6]

External links 

2015 ATP Challenger Tour
2015 in Chinese tennis